Against Democracy is a 2016 book by American political philosopher Jason Brennan.

The book challenges the belief that the simplified version of democracy used in the 21st century is good and moral.

In his work, Brennan primarily suggests that voters tend to be irrational and ignorant about politics. He believes that there is little incentive for voters to inform themselves about politics, as they believe (correctly) that one vote will not make a great difference in the overall election results. Moreover, he states that voters tend to make decisions that are ideologically inclined and easily manipulated.

Brennan presents and discusses different alternatives of "the rule of the knowledgeable" (epistocracy), where only the most knowledgeable voters get to elect our leaders.

Reception
Law professor Ilya Somin, reviewing the book for The Volokh Conspiracy in The Washington Post, described it as an "important new book" whose "analysis of epistocratic alternatives to democracy is worth serious consideration – even if most of these ideas are nowhere near ready for large-scale implementation". Kirkus Reviews said that the book is "Sure to cause howls of disagreement, but in the current toxic partisan climate, Brennan's polemic is as worth weighing as any other."

Los Angeles Times reviewer Molly Sauter found the book's premises "solidly argued, even lively, but not particularly novel" and would have liked Brennan to give more attention to the underlying causes of the problems it describes. New York Magazines Jesse Singal challenges Brennan's position, in particular the premise that a more qualified electorate would necessarily produce better decisions.  Discussing Against Democracy in mid-2017 in the context of increasing numbers of works critical of democracy since mid-2016, Current Affairs editor Nathan J. Robinson said that Brennan's book made "the most spirited and comprehensive" such argument but faulted the author for not addressing epistocracy's vulnerability to confirmation bias and its potential to help restore since-abolished hierarchies, naming Jim Crow laws as a specific example.

Translations
The book has been translated into 10 languages.

In 2020 the Ukrainian translation of Against Democracy was listed by PEN Ukraine among the best translations of Humanitaristics published in 2020. The translation was also short-listed for Ukraine's National Book of the Year 2020 Award.

See also
 Criticism of democracy

External links
 Summary by the author
 Review in The New Yorker

References

2016 non-fiction books
English-language books
Books in political philosophy
Ethics books
Books about democracy
Princeton University Press books